Once More is the fifth collaborative studio album by Porter Wagoner and Dolly Parton. It was released on August 3, 1970, by RCA Victor. The album was produced by Bob Ferguson. It peaked at number 7 on the Billboard Top Country Albums chart  and number 191 on the Billboard 200 chart. The album's single, "Daddy Was an Old Time Preacher Man", peaked at number 7 on the Billboard Hot Country Songs chart and was nominated for Best Country Performance by a Duo or Group at the 13th Annual Grammy Awards.

Recording
Recording sessions for the album began at RCA Studio B in Nashville, Tennessee, on April 21, 1970. Two additional sessions followed on May 5 and 6.

Content
The album includes "Daddy Was an Old Time Preacher Man," written by Parton and her aunt, Dorothy Jo Hope, about Rev. Jake Owens, Parton's maternal grandfather, a Pentecostal minister, in addition to the comical "Fight and Scratch".

Release and promotion
The album was released August 3, 1970, on LP and 8-track.

Singles
The album's only single, "Daddy Was an Old Time Preacher Man", was released in June 1970 and peaked at number 7 on the Billboard Hot Country Songs chart and number 12 in Canada on the RPM Country Singles chart.

Critical reception

The review published by Billboard in the August 15, 1970 issue said, "That lilting voice of Dolly Parton's blends perfectly with the lusty sound of Porter Wagoner – as they prove in definitive measure on the hit "Daddy Was an Old Time Preacher Man" – the key sales impetus on this LP. Some outstanding cuts include the tear-jerker "Ragged Angel", the bright and tart "Fight and Scratch", and "Thoughtfulness". Another winning LP from this duo."

Cashbox published a review in the August 8, 1970 issue, which said, "Here's the new album release by one of country music's most famous duos, Porter Wagoner and Dolly Parton and it's a powerhouse item all the way. Decker features such tracks as "Daddy Was an Old Time Preacher Man", "I Know You're Married But I Love You Still", "Before Our Weakness Gets Too
Strong", "A Good Understanding", and "Let's Live for Tonight". They all get great vocal stylings from the famed duo. Sure to be a
biggie in no time."

AllMusic gave the album 2.5 out of 5 stars.

Commercial performance
The album peaked at number seven on the Billboard Top Country Albums chart and number 191 on the Billboard Billboard 200 chart.

Accolades
The album's single, "Daddy Was an Old Time Preacher Man", received a nomination for Best Country Performance by a Duo or Group at the 13th Annual Grammy Awards. The single also received the Country Award at the 1971 BMI Awards and a Songwriter Achievement Award from the Nashville Songwriters Association International.

Reissues
The album was included in the 2014 box set Just Between You and Me: The Complete Recordings, 1967–1976, marking the first time it had been reissued since its original release. It was made available as a digital download on September 28, 2018. The album was reissued by BGO Records in 2019 on a two CD set with Two of a Kind, Together Always, and The Right Combination • Burning the Midnight Oil.

Track listing

Personnel
Adapted from the album liner notes and RCA recording session records.

Joseph Babcock – background vocals
Jerry Carrigan – drums
Pete Drake – pedal steel
Bobby Dyson – bass
Dolores Edgin – background vocals
Bob Ferguson – producer
Johnny Gimble – fiddle
Dave Kirby – guitar
Les Leverett – cover photo
Mack Magaha – fiddle
George McCormick – rhythm guitar
Louis Owens – liner notes
Hargus Robbins – piano
June Evelyn Page – background vocals
Dolly Parton – lead vocals
Al Pachucki – recording engineer
Dale Sellers – guitar
Roy Shockley – recording technician
Jerry Stembridge – guitar
Buck Trent – banjo
Porter Wagoner – lead vocals
Hurshel Wiginton – background vocals

Charts

Release history

References

Dolly Parton albums
Porter Wagoner albums
1970 albums
Albums produced by Bob Ferguson (music)
Vocal duet albums
RCA Records albums